Keratin, type I cytoskeletal 23 is a protein that in humans is encoded by the KRT23 gene.

The protein encoded by this gene is a member of the keratin family. The keratins are intermediate filament proteins responsible for the structural integrity of epithelial cells and are subdivided into cytokeratin and hair keratin. The type I cytokeratins consist of acidic proteins which are arranged in pairs of heterotypic keratin chains. The type I cytokeratin genes are clustered in a region of chromosome 17q12-q21.

References

Further reading